The 70th District of the Iowa House of Representatives in the state of Iowa.

Current elected officials
Tracy Ehlert is the representative currently representing the district.

Past representatives
The district has previously been represented by:
 Joseph C. Johnston, 1971–1973
 Russell De Jong, 1973–1975
 William W. Dieleman, 1975–1983
 Edward G. Parker, 1983–1989
 Glen Jesse, 1989–1993
 Ed Fallon, 1993–2003
 Carmine Boal, 2003–2009
 Kevin Koester, 2009–2013
 Todd Taylor, 2013–2019
 Tracy Ehlert, 2019–present

References

070